CASP8 and FADD-like apoptosis regulator is a protein that in humans is encoded by the CFLAR gene. Also called c-FLIP (FLICE-like inhibitory protein).

References

Further reading

External links